Jamie Pollock (born 16 February 1974) is an English former football club chairman, manager and professional player. As a player he was a midfielder from 1990 to 2002. He played Premier League football for Middlesbrough, Bolton Wanderers and Manchester City. He also more than 300 appearances in the Football League also appearing for Crystal Palace and Birmingham City as well as a short spell in La Liga with CA Osasuna. From 2003 to 2007 he managed both Spennymoor United and Spennymoor Town.

Playing career
His career began at Middlesbrough where he played as a defensive midfielder. He left Middlesbrough in 1996 joining Spanish side CA Osasuna. After failing to make an impression in Spain he returned to England, signing for Bolton Wanderers. He later played for Manchester City, a team which then fell into what was then Division Two. Pollock scored an own goal in the penultimate game of the season, against Queens Park Rangers, where he flicked the ball over an opposing player before sending a looping header over his own goalkeeper. The own goal condemned Manchester City to relegation to the third tier for the first time, whilst keeping QPR in the division. As a result, a group of QPR fans thanked him by voting him the "most influential man of the past 2,000 years" in an internet poll, where "Jesus came second, apparently."

He was transferred to Crystal Palace and later spent a spell on loan to Birmingham City. On 1 March 2002, Pollock announced his retirement from professional football. He had been without a club since he left Crystal Palace by mutual consent. He was training with Grimsby Town but opted instead to play non-League football and become a director in his family's glass-making business.

Managerial career
Pollock was the manager of non-League club Spennymoor Town until 2007, after his previous club Spennymoor United folded in 2005. His Spennymoor side won the Northern League Division 2 title in 2007. He also coaches a Polton Allstars team that plays in the Teesside Junior Alliance – North Riding League.

Pollock took over as Billingham Synthonia manager at the start of the 2018–19 season. Synthonia finished 10th at the end of season. He stepped down as manager in August 2019 to focus more on his chairman role.

Personal life
In April 2018, Pollock became the chairman of Northern League Division 2 side Billingham Synthonia and also took over as manager. In 2019 he set up Billingham Synthonia Football Academy, and also stepped down as manager to oversee the newly formed academy, and focus on his role as director of football and chairman. He stepped down as chairman of the club in July 2021.

His sons Ben and Mattie also became professional footballers.

Honours

As a player
Middlesbrough
 First Division: 1994–95

Bolton Wanderers
 First Division: 1996–97

Individual
PFA Team of the Year: 1994–95 First Division

As a manager
Spennymoor Town
 Northern League Division Two: 2006–07

References

External links

England profile at The Football Association

1974 births
Living people
English footballers
English football managers
England under-21 international footballers
Premier League players
Middlesbrough F.C. players
La Liga players
CA Osasuna players
Bolton Wanderers F.C. players
Manchester City F.C. players
Crystal Palace F.C. players
Birmingham City F.C. players
England youth international footballers
Association football midfielders
Spennymoor United F.C. managers
Spennymoor Town F.C. managers
Billingham Synthonia F.C. managers